Michael Patrick Fitzgerald (born March 28, 1964 in Savannah, Georgia) is a retired Major League Baseball first baseman.  He was drafted by the St. Louis Cardinals in the first round (20th overall) of the 1984 June Secondary amateur draft.  In 1986, Fitzgerald led the Class A Springfield Cardinals with 147 hits, 29 doubles, 19 home runs, 93 RBIs, and a league-leading 17 game-winning RBIs.  He appeared in 13 games for the 1988 St. Louis Cardinals.

References

External links

1964 births
Living people
Middle Georgia Warriors baseball players
St. Louis Cardinals players
Baseball players from Savannah, Georgia